Percy Leonard Whipp (28 June 1897 – 18 October 1962) was a Scottish professional footballer who played as a forward in the Football League for Leeds United and Clapton Orient. He also played league football for Swindon Town, Brentford and Sunderland.

Personal life 
Whipp served as a gunner in the Royal Field Artillery during the First World War.

Honours 
Leeds United
 Football League Second Division: 1923–24

Career statistics

References

External links
Profile at leeds-fans.org.uk

1897 births
1962 deaths
Scottish footballers
Leeds United F.C. players
Sunderland A.F.C. players
Leyton Orient F.C. players
Brentford F.C. players
Swindon Town F.C. players
Bath City F.C. players
Footballers from Glasgow
English Football League players
Association football forwards
Worcester City F.C. players
Royal Field Artillery soldiers
British Army personnel of World War I
Southern Football League players
Ton Pentre F.C. players